Michael Herman Schwartz (born May 9, 1942) is an American sociologist and prominent critic of the Iraq war. He is a Distinguished Teaching Professor Emeritus of Sociology at the State University of New York at Stony Brook in New York, where he also serves as faculty director of the Undergraduate College of Global Studies and Chair of the Sociology Department. Schwartz has written extensively in the areas of economic sociology and social movements.

Career
Schwartz received his doctorate from the Department of Social Relations, Harvard University, where he was a student of Harrison White and Charles Tilly. His writings on Iraq have appeared in TomDispatch, Asia Times, Mother Jones, and Contexts. In Radical Protest and Social Structure, Schwartz develops the concept of "structural ignorance" to refer to how individuals make choices and decisions in regard to collective action based on their position in the social structure, which constrains their access to relevant information.

Books

Solely authored books

Co-authored books

Edited books

Articles
Takuyoshi Takada, Beth Mintz, and Michael Schwartz (eds.) Corporate Control, Capital Institute of Business Research. Tokyo: Chuo University Press, 1996.

See also
Social Movement Theories
Opposition to the Iraq War

References

Wrecked Iraq: What the Good News from Iraq Really Means. 
War Without End: The Iraq War in Context.

1942 births
Living people
Harvard Graduate School of Arts and Sciences alumni
American sociologists
Stony Brook University faculty
20th-century American non-fiction writers
20th-century American male writers
21st-century American non-fiction writers
21st-century American male writers
American male non-fiction writers